Primulina modesta is a plant in the family Gesneriaceae, native to Vietnam. It was formerly placed in the genus Chirita.

Description
Primulina modesta grows as a perennial herb.

Distribution and habitat
Primulina modesta is endemic to Vietnam, where it is confined to Tam Cung Cave, on an island in Hạ Long Bay, a UNESCO World Heritage Site. Its habitat is in shaded crevices on the vertical cliffs near the mouth of the cave.

Conservation
Primulina modesta has been assessed as critically endangered on the IUCN Red List. The species is confined to a small area and the population has been estimated at fewer than 50 plants.

References

modesta
Endemic flora of Vietnam
Plants described in 2000